= Fratelli-B =

Fratelli-B is a hip hop duo made up of Chandro and Flap5. Both members are natives of Baar, Switzerland.

Since November 2001 the two brothers - Chandro (born Nicolas Bisig) and Flap5 (born Benedikt Bisig) - are known as Fratelli-B. The name Fratelli-B is an allusion to their Italian roots. Since their early childhood they have been interested in HipHop Music, so Flap5 wrote his first rhymes with the age of 13 and Chandro worked with his buddy DJ Juicy on music, too. Together with DJ Juicy the Group released their first EP "Wer weiss..." on the Swiss Underground Label "Eastbound" in 2005. Their first video ("Nachwivor") made heavy rotation on the Swiss music channel VIVA. The duo's lyrics are in "Mundart" one of several German dialects. Nevertheless Fratelli-B is not just famous in Switzerland. The song "Welcome" is on the official soundtrack of Konami's Crime Life video game along with other artists like D12 and they have also done several collaborations with German artists, for example Spaxx.

== Discography ==
- 2005 Wer weiss... (EP)
- 2005 Nachwivor (Video)
- 2005 Allcity Allstars - Schattenkrieger
